Free Ride is a 1986 comedy film. Cast includes Gary Hershberger, Reed Rudy, Mamie Van Doren, Peter DeLuise  and Frank Campanella.

Plot
A group of teenagers borrow a car, unaware that gangsters have stashed mob money in it. The gangsters are determined to get the money back. When it seems that the criminals are going to prevail over the boys, the intervention of a strong policewoman changes the fortunes of the battle in favor of the boys.

Cast
 Gary Hershberger as Dan Garten
 Reed Rudy as Greg Novak
 Dawn Schneider as Jill Monroe
 Peter DeLuise as Carl Beluga
 Brian MacGregor as Elmer Reynolds
 Warren Berlinger as Dean Stockwell
 Mamie Van Doren as Debbie Stockwell
 Renee Props as Kathy
 Chick Vennera as Edgar Ness
 Anthony Charnota as Vinnie Garbagio
 Mario Marcelino as Vito Garbagio
 Joe Tornatore as Murray Garbagio
 Ken Olfson as Mr. Stanley Lennox
 Liam Sullivan as Mr. Monroe
 Frank Campanella as Old Man Garbagio
 Tally Chanel as Candy
 Terresa Hafford as Monique
 Vicki Seton as Marie
 Kevin Welch as Brent
 Karen L. Scott as Stuck-Up Woman
 Mary Garripoli as Girl In Slip
 Crystal Smart as Vito's Girlfriend
 Elizabeth Cochrell as Nude Girl #1
 Krista Lane as Nude Girl #2
 Millie Moss as Lady In Disco #1
 Roberta Smart as Lady In Disco #2
 Caroline Davis as Lady In Disco #3
 Christina MacGregor as Jill's Friend
 Robert Apisa as Thug #1
 Michael Carr as Thug #2
 Diana Bellamy as Woman Guard
 Sasha Jenson as Boy #1
 John Washington as Boy #2
 Robert De Frank as The Bartender

Home media
The movie was released on VHS in the United States by International Video Entertainment in 1987 and that same year in Canada by Cineplex Odeon. A LaserDisc release followed in 1992 also in the United States by Live Home Video. As of 2022, there has been no Region 1 DVD nor has there been any plans so far for a Region 1 Bluray.

External links

1986 films
1986 comedy films
1980s English-language films